KRLJ-LD is a low-powered Defy TV television station licensed to Joplin, Missouri. The station, which broadcasts its digital signal on virtual channel 45 and UHF channel 25, is owned by HC2 Holdings, and operated by DTV America.

History 
The station’s construction permit was initially issued on May 17, 2011 under the calls of K45LR-D  . The current KRLJ-LD calls were assigned on February 8, 2017.

In October 2017, KRLJ-LD was one of a handful of stations to be sold to HC2 Holdings, but remain operated by DTV America.

In December 31 of 2022, Azteca America cease operations.

Digital channels

References

External links
DTV America

Low-power television stations in the United States
Innovate Corp.
RLJ-LD
Television channels and stations established in 2011
2011 establishments in Missouri